Nathalie is a female given name.

Nathalie may also refer to:
 Nathalie (film), a 1957 French-Italian film directed by Christian-Jaque
Nathalie..., a 2003 French film starring Fanny Ardant
 "Nathalie" (song), a 1964 song by Gilbert Bécaud
 "Nathalie", a song by Julio Iglesias from his 1982 album Momentos

See also 
 Natalie (disambiguation)